Michel Debray (born 10 September 1936) is a French admiral and politician.

Military career 
He was in charge of the aircraft carriers Foch and Clemenceau.

Political career 
From 1988 to 1999, he led the Fondation Charles-de-Gaulle, between Jean Foyer and Yves Guéna.

In 1997, he participated in the foundation of the Alliance pour la souveraineté de la France. He is a member of the high council of the Forum pour la France of Pierre Marie Gallois. He is charged, with the admiral Claude Gaucherand, of the commission of the National defense.

In September 2012, he joined with his wife the Popular Republican Union.

References

External links 
 His biography

French Navy admirals
Politicians of the French Fifth Republic
Popular Republican Union (2007) politicians
Commandeurs of the Légion d'honneur
Commanders of the Ordre national du Mérite
1936 births
Living people